Nothing New may refer to:

 Nothing New (album), a 2014 album by Gil Scott-Heron
 Nothing New, a 2011 EP by Tadpole

 "Nothing New" (song), a 2021 song by Taylor Swift featuring Phoebe Bridgers
 "Nothing New", a song by Ashlee Simpson from the album Autobiography, 2004
 "Nothin' New", a song by Gloria Estefan from the album Cuts Both Ways, 1989
 "Nothin' New", a song by Ab-Soul
 "Nothin' New", a song by 21 Savage from Issa Album 2017